Richard Hamilton (December 31, 1920 – December 21, 2004) was an American film, television, theater, and radio actor. He was raised in California, where he worked at the Pasadena Playhouse, before moving to Broadway. There, he performed in award-winning productions of Buried Child and Mornings at Seven. He acted in over 50 radio, movie and TV roles, including various roles in the science fiction radio series X Minus One, playing Tommy Lee Jones's first partner in Men in Black, and a recurring role in the Bret Maverick 1981 television series.

Hamilton died at his home in the Catskills on December 21, 2004, ten days before his 84th birthday.

Filmography

References

External links 

1920 births
2004 deaths
American male radio actors
American male film actors
American male television actors
American male stage actors
20th-century American male actors